Ōhori, Ohori or Oohori (written: 大堀 lit. "big canal") is a Japanese surname. Notable people with the surname include:

, Japanese badminton player
, Japanese actor
, Japanese singer and television personality

Etymology 
"Ōhori" originally meant a large moat. It is derived from Kuroda Nagamasa, a lord of Fukuoka, who reclaimed the northern half of Kusage, an inlet facing Hakata Bay. He then made a moat for the Fukuoka castle.

See also
Ōhori Park, a park in Chūō-ku, Fukuoka Prefecture, Japan 
Ōhori Station, a railway station in Mogami, Yamagata Prefecture, Japan

References

Japanese-language surnames